Big Brother Canada 11 is the eleventh season of the Canadian reality television series Big Brother Canada. The series premiered on March 8, 2023, on Global. Hosted by Arisa Cox, the show revolves around sixteen contestants (known as HouseGuests), who volunteered to reside in a house under constant surveillance and without any communication with the outside world as they compete to win a grand prize of C$100,000 cash.

Format 

Big Brother Canada follows a group of contestants, known as HouseGuests who move into a custom-built house outfitted with cameras and microphones, recording their every move 24 hours a day. The HouseGuests are sequestered in the Big Brother Canada House with no contact with the outside world. During their stay, the HouseGuests share their thoughts on events and other HouseGuests inside a private room referred to as the Diary Room. At the start of each week in the house, the HouseGuests compete for the title of Head of Household, often shortened to simply HoH. The winner of the HoH competition is immune from eviction and will name two HouseGuests to be nominated for eviction. After the nominees are determined, the Power of Veto competition is played. Five players will compete in the competition: the two nominees and three random players, with the winner receiving the Power of Veto. If a HouseGuest chooses to exercise the Power of Veto, the Head of Household is obligated to name a replacement nominee. The holder of the Power of Veto is safe from being nominated as the replacement nominee. On eviction night, all HouseGuests must vote to evict one of the nominees, with the exception of the nominees and the Head of Household. The eviction vote is by secret ballot, with HouseGuests casting their votes orally in the Diary Room. In the event of a tied vote, the Head of Household will cast a tie-breaking vote publicly. The nominee with the majority of the votes is evicted from the house. Midway through the season, the evicted HouseGuests go on to become members of the "jury"; the jury is responsible for choosing who wins the series. The final Head of Household competition is split into three parts; the winners of the first two rounds compete in the third and final round. Once only two HouseGuests remain, the members of the jury cast their votes for who should win the series.

HouseGuests 

The images and profiles of the HouseGuests for the eleventh season were released on Wednesday, March 1, 2023.

Summary
On Day 1, 16 HouseGuests entered the murder-mystery themed Big Brother Canada Manor. Arisa revealed the first piece of big news. No one would be evicted in the first week. However, she revealed the first big twist of the season, known as "Dead Last". The HouseGuest to place last in the Head of Household competition will be on the block as a third nominee. The HouseGuests competed in the Rough Around the Hedges Head of Household competition. In the first part of the competition, one HouseGuest from each pair must untie knots to release a series of puzzle pieces. They must then weave a key through the vines up to their teammate, who will unlock the hatch and untie their own pieces. Each pair must then work together to solve the puzzle. The first pair to complete the puzzle will win the competition and will compete against one another for Head of Household. The last-place pair will also compete against each other to determine Dead Last. John Michael and Santina were the winners, while Renee and Shanaya came in last. In the second part of the competition, each pair went head-to-head. They must complete a puzzle of season 10 Winner Kevin Jacobs' head. They must then maneuver their hedges so they can roll a ball down a chute into his crown. The first HouseGuest to land the ball (between John Michael and Santina) will be the first Head of Household; the last HouseGuest to land the ball (between Renee and Shanaya) would become Dead Last. Renee became Dead Last, and Santina became the first Head of Household. On Day 4, Amal walked from the game for personal reasons. John Michael told Zach that he wanted to target the strong men if he won HOH. Zach, in turn, rallied the other guys together to convince Santina to go after John Michael. The HouseGuests also learned they can earn Wendy's Reward Points that could help their game in the future. On Day 6, the HouseGuests learned Canada voted to give one person the "BelAir Direct Eviction Protection Insurance", granting them immunity for the week. Canada saved Claudia for the week. On Day 7, Santina nominated Anika and Dan alongside Renee for eviction, with the plan to backdoor John Michael. On Day 8, Anika, Dan, and Renee, alongside Daniel and Ty, competed in the Can't Slop, Won't Slop Power of Veto competition. In this competition, HouseGuests must fill their cups with secret sauce, slide down their lane, and pour it into their jugs. After their jugs are full, they must mix it with oatmeal to make slop. HouseGuests have to then launch the slop into their barrel to lift it. The first HouseGuest to raise their barrel will win the Power of Veto, while the losers will go on slop until after the Veto Meeting. Ty was the winner; Anika, Dan, Daniel, and Renee went on slop. On Day 10, Ty took Anika off the block, and Santina nominated John Michael as the replacement nominee.

Episodes

Twists

Dead Last Nomination 
In Week 2, the HouseGuest who placed last in the Head of Household competition was automatically nominated as the Dead Last Nominee.

Belairdirect Eviction Protection Insurance 
Occasionally throughout the season, the public would vote for one HouseGuest to earn the Belairdirect Eviction Protection Insurance. The HouseGuest who receives the most votes would be immune from that week's eviction. Once that HouseGuest earns immunity, they would not be eligible again to receive this immunity for the rest of the season. This immunity was sponsored by BelAirDirect.

 On Day 1, it was announced that the viewers would be voting to decide which HouseGuest would receive immunity from nominations for Week 2. The voter may vote for multiple HouseGuests with no vote limits being imposed. On Day 6, Claudia received the most votes and was awarded the immunity.

Other twists 

 No first week eviction: On Week 1, there was no eviction.

Production

Development 

The eleventh season will be produced by Insight Productions, in association with Corus Entertainment and Banijay. The season was first announced on June 8, 2022, at the Corus upfronts for the 2022–23 Canadian network television schedule. A press release for the show's renewal confirmed that Arisa Cox would return as a host and as an executive producer. Executive producers John Brunton, Erin Brock and Eric Abboud were also confirmed to be returning for the season. Casting began on August 8, 2022, with Kassting Inc. returning to provide casting services for the show. Online applications opened upon the start of casting and closed on November 11, 2022; the cast was announced on March 1, 2023. On February 6, 2023, it was announced that the season would premiere on March 8, 2023.

Prizes 
In addition to the main C$100,000 cash prize, the winner, as decided by a jury of evicted HouseGuests, will win an additional C$10,000 provided by Winners intended for new clothing, and C$10,000 worth of SharkNinja products. Meanwhile, the runner-up receives C$20,000 and the HouseGuest voted as Canada's Favourite HouseGuest receives $10,000.

Production design 
On February 27, Global released images of the HoH room, foyer, diary room, and the bathroom of the new house, billed as the Big Brother Canada Manor. The house is built with hidden passageways and hidden twists "designed to stroke paranoia in the house".

Digital Dailies 
On February 23, it was announced that the show's 24/7 live feeds will be replaced with "Digital Dailies", featuring uncut footage from the house that will be published weekly on the show's website. The move received backlash online.

Voting history

Notes

Reception 
Prior to the season's premiere, Lorraine Palinkas of ScreenRant described the elimination of the 24/7 live feeds in lieu of the "Digital Dailies" as "surprising", while commenting that "it seems that production felt that the feeds were doing more harm than good".

References

External links 
Global official site

2023 Canadian television seasons
Big Brother Canada seasons